Sindhi cinema refers to the Sindhi language film industry in Sindh, Pakistan and among the Sindhi diaspora specially in India.

History
The first Sindhi film produced was Ekta in 1940 directed by Homi Wadia and the last film was Himmath which was released on 1997; while the first Sindhi film produced in Pakistan was Umar Marvi in 1956 directed by Shaikh Hassan. The first blockbuster Sindhi film released was Abana released in 1958. Sindhi cinema used to see three to four releases a year until the 1990s. The last Sindhi film released was Himmat in 1997.

Issues 
Satish Anand said that the condition of the theatres is bad, funding is difficult and people prefer mainstream cinema. Many producers have tried to revive the industry but eventually it fell apart. An alternate model of releasing films only on television and home video was attempted,  but that too didn't work because of rampant piracy.

Revival 
Since 2010, Sindhi Cinema in Pakistan has seen a general revival of Sindhi films.

Many artists and actors have proposed their proposals to revive the capability and ability of the Sindhi cinema. With Ranveer Singh having said to create the first mass Sindhi film called Dadho Sutho. However as of January 2023, this has not been confirmed.

Films

Some popular Sindhi films include:
 Ekta (1942)
 Umar Marvi (1956)
 Perdesi (1958)
 Sherah Feroz (1968)
 Chanduki (1969)
Ghoonghat Lah Kunwar (1970)
 Mehboob Mitha (1971)
 Ali Jo Ghulam (2014)
 Haider Khan (2015)
 Pyar Jaa Rang (2013) Actors - Anil Vanjani, Poonam, Tarana
Haseen Zindagi (2015) Actors - Anil Vanjani, Kalpana Bhagtani.
Heer . 
Qwert

Classical Sindhi cinema actors/actresses 

 Bhagwanti Navani
 Chakori 
 Mushtaq Malano, his stage name was Mushtaq Changazi  and played lead role in more than 60 Sindhi cinema movies.
 Salahudin Tunio
 Shahzadi
 Mahmood Siddiqui
 Soxie Deniel
 Shafi Muhammd Shah. 
 Rubi Ali 
 Amir Shah
 Urossa Siddiqui 
 Fahaad Mustafa 
 Danish Nawaz 
 Sanam Bolach

See also 
Sindhi Drama industry .

 Cinema of Pakistan

References

 
Sindhi-language mass media
Mass media in Sindh